The Pallone d'Argento – Coppa Giaime Fiumanò (Silver Ball) was an annual award instituted by the Unione Stampa Sportiva Italiana (Italian Sports Press Association) or USSI. It was presented to Serie A players for their talent as well as sporting fairness and moral qualities.

Winners

See also
 Oscar del Calcio

References

External links
 Unione Stampa Sportiva Italiana official website

Association football trophies and awards
European football trophies and awards
Italian football trophies and awards
Serie A players
Sportsmanship trophies and awards
Awards established in 2000
Association football player non-biographical articles